Niphoparmena flavostictica is a species of beetle in the family Cerambycidae. It was described by André Villiers in 1940.

References

flavostictica
Beetles described in 1940